Suppiluliuma II, the son of Tudḫaliya IV, was the last known king of the New Kingdom of the Hittite Empire, ruling –1178 BC (short chronology), contemporary with Tukulti-Ninurta I of the Middle Assyrian Empire.

Life and reign

In 1210 BC, a fleet under his command defeated the Cypriots, the first recorded naval battle in history. According to some historians (Claude Schaeffer, Horst Nowacki, Wolfgang Lefèvre), this and following two victories against Cypriots were probably won by using Ugaritic ships.

He is known from two inscriptions in Hieroglyphic Luwian. They record wars against former vassal Tarhuntassa, and against Alasiya in Cyprus. One inscription is found at the base of Nisantepe in the Upper City of Hattusa; the other is on the northern corner of the East Pond (Pond 1), in what is known as Chamber 2. This served as a water reservoir for Hattusa.

The chamber 2 reliefs are historically important since it records major political instability which plagued Hatti during Suppiluliuma's reign. It states that this ruler sacked the city of Tarhutassa which was a Hittite city and had briefly served as the Empire's political capital under the reign of Muwatalli II.

The Sea Peoples had already begun their push down the Mediterranean coastline, starting from the Aegean, and continuing all the way to Canaan, founding the state of Philistia—taking Cilicia and Cyprus away from the Hittites en route and cutting off their coveted trade routes. Based on records in Ugarit, the threat originated in the west, and the Hittite king asked for assistance from Ugarit.
 The enemy [advances(?)] against us and there is no number [...]. Our number is pure(?) [. . .] Whatever is available, look for it and send it to me.

Suppiluliuma II was probably the ruler who abandoned the capital city of Hattusa, inducing the end of the Hittite empire. Some sources indicate Suppiluliuma II's end is unknown or he was simply "vanished", while some claim he was killed during the sack of Hattusa in 1190 BC.

After Suppiluliuma's kingdom collapsed, the Kaskians possibly took over control of Hatti. Hattusa itself was destroyed by fire, its site only re-occupied by a Phrygian fortress some 500 years later. Kuzi-Teshub, a ruler of Carchemish, would later assume the title of "Great King" since he was a direct descendant of Suppiluliuma I.

See also

 History of the Hittites

Notes

References
Astour, AJA 69 (1965).
Güterbock, JNES 26 (1967), 73-81.

External links
Reign of Suppiluliuma II

Hittite kings
1170s BC deaths
Year of birth unknown
Late Bronze Age collapse